Mersin Tennis Complex is a multi tennis court constructed for the 2013 Mediterranean Games in Mersin, Turkey.

Geography
At about  the tennis complex is situated to the west of the city center.

Description
The complex consists of two blocks.  There are two indoor and eight open courts in the complex. The total sitting capacity of the main court is 3000.

2013 Mediterranean Games
At 2013 Mediterranean Games the complex hosted tennis event between 24th and 29 June.

References

Tennis venues in Turkey
2013 Mediterranean Games venues
Sports venues in Mersin
Yenişehir, Mersin
Sports venues completed in 2013